Sekou Sylla (born 1 January 1992) is a Guinean professional footballer who plays as a forward for Myanmar National League club Yangon United.He is Yangon United's all-time Third-highest goalscorer with 46 Goals.

Club career

Sriracha
Sylla began his professional career at Sriracha of Thai Division 1 League in March 2012 and played until December 2012.

Chanthaburi
In January 2014, he signed with another Thai side Chanthaburi, that competes in the League 3 but has not appeared in any league match.

Magwe
In 2014, Sylla moved to Myanmar National League and signed with Magwe. He represented the club in 2017 AFC Cup, where he made four appearances, notching an equalizer to tie with Malaysian side Johor Darul Ta'zim 1–1, and another goal to salvage a 1–1 draw with Cambodian side Boeung Ket.

With Magwe, he appeared in 88 league matches between 2014 and 2017, scoring 18 goals. He also won the 2016 General Aung San Shield with them, defeating Yangon 2–1.

Global Cebu
Traded to Filipino side Global Cebu in 2017, the Guinean authored a brace for his new club in a 3–1 win over Kaya FC-Makati, and earning the man of the match award. He played only 3 matches for the Philippines Football League side and scored 5 goals.

Yangon United
In December 2017, he moved to another Burmese side Yangon United and appeared in domestic tournaments such as Myanmar National League, General Aung San Shield, and MPT Charity Cup. With Yangon, he played in the 2018 AFC Cup and scored 10 goals in 7 matches. He was in the squad of United, that won 2018 General Aung San Shield defeating Hanthawaddy United 2–1, where he scored a goal.

In 2018, Yangon also won the Myanmar National League title and Sylla emerged as second highest goalscorer with 17 goals, behind Joseph Mpande. Between 2017 and 2019, he scored a total of 41 goals in 53 matches.

Haiphong
In 2020, he moved to Vietnamese V.League 1 side Haiphong FC.

Churchill Brothers
In July 2021, Sylla signed for I-League outfit Churchill Brothers for their 2021–22 I-League season. He is the first foreign recruit of the season for the Goa-based side. He made his debut in their 1–0 defeat to Gokulam Kerala on 26 December.

Honours
Magwe
 General Aung San Shield: 2016
Yangon United
 Myanmar National League: 2018
 General Aung San Shield: 2018

References

External links
Sekou Sylla profile at flashscore.in
Churchill Brothers rope in Sekou Sylla

Living people
1992 births
Guinean footballers
Expatriate footballers in the Philippines
Expatriate footballers in Myanmar
Myanmar National League players
Association football forwards
Guinean expatriate footballers
Yangon United F.C. players
Global Makati F.C. players
Expatriate footballers in India
I-League players
Churchill Brothers FC Goa players